The Battle of Saguntum (25 October 1811) saw the Imperial French Army of Aragon under Marshal Louis Gabriel Suchet defend against a Spanish army led by Captain General Joaquín Blake. The Spanish attempt to raise the siege of the Sagunto Castle failed when the French, Italians, and Poles drove their troops off the battlefield in rout. The 20,000 French inflicted 6,000 casualties on their more numerous opponents, including many prisoners, while sustaining only about 1,000 casualties.

Suchet hoped to quickly seize Sagunto Castle, but the 2,600-man Spanish garrison repulsed two of his assaults with several hundred casualties. Blake hoped to force Suchet to retreat by cutting off his supplies. The guerillas inflicted two stinging defeats on the French-Allied forces, but ultimately failed to shake Suchet's resolve. Blake reluctantly ordered his army to relieve the siege, even though he was not confident in the ability of his soldiers to face Suchet's veterans. Blake heavily weighted his left wing while keeping his best troops in the weaker right wing. The Spanish left wing attacked the much weaker French right flank and was completely routed by French infantry and Italian cavalry. The Spanish right wing gave a much better account of itself, forcing Suchet to commit all his reserves before forcing it to withdraw. Eventually, the French cavalry put the whole Spanish army to rout. Their hopes of relief dashed, the garrison of Sagunto Castle quickly surrendered. The action took place during the Peninsular War, part of the Napoleonic Wars.

The Siege of Valencia (3 November 1811 – 9 January 1812) saw Suchet's army envelop and besiege most of Blake's army in the city of Valencia. The 30,000 French troops compelled 16,000 Spanish soldiers to surrender at the conclusion of the siege, although another 7,000 Spaniards escaped from the trap. Suchet quickly converted Valencia into an important base of operations. Valencia, modern-day capital of the Valencian Community, is located on the east coast of Spain.

Blake army waited passively in a line of fortifications outside Valencia. Reinforced by 13,000 Franco-Italian troops, the bulk of Suchet's army marched around the Spanish left flank and rolled up Blake's lines. Another Imperial French division managed to break through the Spanish right flank. The right and left Imperial pincers closed around Valencia. Two-thirds of Blake's army retreated within the city while the remainder withdrew to the west. After an abortive attempt to break out, Blake surrendered after a two-month siege.

Orders of Battle

French-Allied Army

Spanish Army

Footnotes

References
 

Peninsular War orders of battle